Jonathan Lee Walton (born June 22, 1973) is an author, ethicist and religious scholar. He is the President of Princeton Theological Seminary in Princeton, New Jersey. He was previously Dean of Wake Forest University School of Divinity, Presidential Chair in Religion & Society and Dean of Wait Chapel. He is the author of A Lens of Love: Reading the Bible in its World for Our World.

Early life and education 
Walton was born in Frederick, Maryland to John H. Walton and Rose Marie Walton. His father was an air traffic controller with the Federal Aviation Administration and his mother was a homemaker. His family moved to Syracuse, New York before settling in Atlanta, Georgia in 1980.

In 1991, Walton graduated from Lithonia High School and attended Wofford College on a football scholarship. He transferred to Morehouse College following his freshman year and graduated in 1996 with a BA degree in political science. Walton also became a licensed minister that same year and entered the Princeton Theological Seminary in 1999, completing his MDiv in 2002 and his PhD in 2006.

Career 
Walton began his professional career as a minister while pursuing his academic studies. He served as the officiating pastor of Memorial West Presbyterian Church in Newark, New Jersey.

In 2003, he was appointed a lecturer at Princeton University’s Department of Religion and The Program in African American Studies. He accepted a position as assistant professor of Religious Studies at the University of California in 2006.

Walton joined the faculty at Harvard University in 2010 as assistant professor of African American Religions, Harvard Divinity School, and resident scholar of Lowell House, Harvard College.

In 2012, he was appointed the Plummer Professor of Christian Morals and Pusey Minister in the Memorial Church, following the death of the Rev. Peter J. Gomes, who served in the position for 41 years.

Walton served on several boards and committees at Harvard as well as the Board of Trustees at Princeton Theological Seminary, and the National Advisory Board of the John C. Danforth Center on Religion & Politics at Washington University in St. Louis.

In 2019, he was appointed the Dean of Wake Forest University School of Divinity, Presidential Chair in Religion & Society and Dean of Wait Chapel.

In 2022, he was announced as the new President of Princeton Theological Seminary, a seminary in Princeton, New Jersey. In this position, he succeeded the previous president, Presbyterian minister M. Craig Barnes.

Scholarship 
Much of Walton's scholarship is focused on evangelical Christianity, and its relationship to mass media and political culture. His first book, Watch This! The Ethics and Aesthetics of Black Televangelism (NYU Press 2009), examines the theological and political traditions of African American religious broadcasters.

His work and insights have been featured in several national and international news outlets including the New York Times, CNN, Huffpost and Time.  Walton is an outspoken advocate for oppressed and vulnerable people in society.

Walton's book A Lens of Love: Reading the Bible in Its World for Our World (Westminster John Knox Press 2018), is an extension of his work from the pulpit and classroom. The book is the interpretative exploration of the Bible from the perspective of the most vulnerable and violated characters in scripture.

In his review of the book, Cornel West said Walton “is one of the very few grand figures in American culture who is both public intellectual and prophetic preacher. His brilliant work and visionary words are legendary at Harvard and throughout the country and world. This timely book is another testament to his calling rooted in the legacies of Martin Luther King Jr., Benjamin Elijah Mays, Reinhold Niebuhr and Fannie Lou Hamer.”

Walton was appointed dean of the Wake Forest University School of Divinity in April 2019. He assumed the position on July 1, 2019.

Awards and honors 
 Benjamin Elijah Mays Distinguished Alumni Award in Religion, Morehouse College, 2017.
 Honorary Doctor of Divinity Degree, Wake Forest University, 2015.
 Young Scholars in American Religion 2009–2011, Center for Religion and American Culture, Indiana University-Purdue University.
 Resident Fellow, Center for Ideas and Society, UC Riverside, 2007.

Personal life 
Walton and his wife, Cecily Cline Walton and their three children live in Winston-Salem, NC.

References

External links
 Official website
 Professor Jonathan L. Walton: Sermons & Addresses 2016–17

Living people
Harvard Divinity School faculty
American theologians
Morehouse College alumni
Princeton Theological Seminary alumni
1973 births
Wake Forest University faculty